The Midland Regional Hospital, Tullamore is a public hospital located in Tullamore, County Offaly, Ireland. It is managed by Dublin Midlands Hospital Group.

History
The foundation stone for the hospital, which was designed by Scott & Gould, was laid by Seán T. O'Kelly, Minister of Local Government and Public Health, on 31 March 1937. It was officially opened as Tullamore General Hospital in December 1942.

Services
The hospital provides 254 beds, of which 207 are in-patient acute beds, while 47 are reserved for acute day cases.

See also
 Midland Regional Hospital, Mullingar
 Midland Regional Hospital, Portlaoise

References

External links

Buildings and structures in Tullamore
Health Service Executive hospitals
Hospitals in County Offaly
Hospital buildings completed in 1942
Hospitals established in 1942
1942 establishments in Ireland
20th-century architecture in the Republic of Ireland